Moncofa (in valencian and officially, in Spanish Moncófar) is a municipality of the Province of Castellón in the Valencian Community, Spain.

Notable people
 Pere Martí, footballer
 Pol Bueso, footballer

External links
Official website of Moncofa
 Instituto Valenciano de Estadística

Valencian Community